Pierre Joseph Louis Déjoie (23 February 1896 – 11 July 1969, Port-au-Prince, Haiti) was a wealthy Haitian sugar planter, industrialist, agricultural engineer, landowner and politician.

Early years
Déjoie was a descendant of a French slave-holder, and former Haitian President Fabre Geffrard, who overthrew the Faustin empire.

He ran for the Presidency against Francois Duvalier in 1957 Haitian general election. His party only won 2 of the 37 seats in the country's Chamber of Deputies, and he received only 26.6% of the vote to Duvalier's 72.4%.

References

1896 births
1969 deaths
Candidates for President of Haiti
20th-century Haitian businesspeople
Haitian anti-communists
Haitian exiles
Haitian people of French descent
Haitian people of Mulatto descent